Charles in Charge is an American situation comedy television series created by Michael Jacobs and Barbara Weisberg. Charles in Charge follows Charles (Scott Baio), a college student working as a live-in babysitter. In the first season, Charles worked for the Pembroke family. In the second season, the Pembrokes sublet their house to the Powell family, for whom Charles then worked in the remaining seasons.

It premiered on October 3, 1984 and ended on November 10, 1990, with a total of 126 episodes over the course of five seasons. The first season originally aired on CBS from 1984 to 1985 and the reaming seasons originally aired in syndication from 1987 to 1990. All five seasons are available on DVD.

Series overview

Episodes

Season 1 (1984–85)

Season 2 (1987)

Season 3 (1987–88)

Season 4 (1988–89)

Season 5 (1989–90)

External links
 
 Completely Unofficial Charles in Charge page

Charles in Charge